Volume 3 is the fourth studio album by She & Him, a collaboration between M. Ward and actress Zooey Deschanel. It was released by Merge Records on May 7, 2013 in the United States and on May 13, 2013 by Double Six Records in the United Kingdom. On the album, there are eleven songs written by Deschanel and three cover songs.

On March 7, 2013, the song "Never Wanted Your Love" was released as a single. On April 10, 2013, the song "I Could've Been Your Girl" was released for streaming via Soundcloud.

Critical reception
Upon release, Volume 3 received positive acclaim from music critics. At Metacritic, which assigned a normalized rating out of 100 based on reviews from mainstream publications, the album has a score of 67 out of 100, indicating generally favorable reviews (based on 29 reviews). Gregory Heaney of Allmusic praised She and Him's "sunny, lovestruck sounds." Magnet stated that the album is "instantly likeable," and Dale Eisinger of Consequence of Sound commented that the album contains many "effortless and fully realized songs." However, while Rudy K. of Sputnikmusic praised, "the simplicity of the songs and the everyday romance they conjure," he also noted that at times the album "feels rote, a meticulous tastefulness that is pretty and nostalgic, yet largely uninteresting."

Commercial performance
Volume 3 debuted at number 15 on the Billboard 200, with first-week sales of 26,000 copies in the United States.

Track listing

Personnel
She & Him
Zooey Deschanel – lead and harmony vocals, percussion (1, 2, 6, 8), keyboards (1, 4, 8), piano (6, 12, 13), tambourine (3), vibraphone (7), taropatch ukulele (5)
M. Ward – guitars, backing vocals (2, 5, 7, 13), lead vocals (3), piano (1, 3), organ (4, 11), percussion (2), horn arrangement

Additional musicians
Scott McPherson – drums
Joey Spampinato, Tyler Tornfelt, Mike Watt, Pierre de Reeder – bass
Tom Hagerman – violin
Amanda Lawrence – viola
Tilly and the Wall – gang vocals

Horn section on "Together" and "Snow Queen"
Art Baron – trombone
C. J. Camerieri – trumpet
Doug Wieselman – saxophone

Charts

References

External links
She & Him website

Volume 03
Merge Records albums
2013 albums
Double Six Records albums
Sequel albums